Rafik Sorman is a Libyan football club based in Sorman, Libya.
The team played in Libyan Premier League in 2007, but were relegated at the end of the season.

Current players
 Abdulwahab Hassn
 Rabe Al Msellati

Football clubs in Libya
Association football clubs established in 1959
Sorman
1959 establishments in Libya